Rossiya Airlines, sometimes branded as Rossiya—Russian Airlines,  is one of the oldest and largest air carriers of the Russian Federation. It was founded on 7 May 1934. It is a part of Aeroflot Group. Rossiya is the largest and the base carrier of Pulkovo Airport (Saint Petersburg).

History

Merger with Pulkovo Aviation Enterprise 

In November 2006, it was announced that the merger had been completed and Rossiya Airlines was registered in Saint Petersburg on 9 October 2006 and has a branch in Moscow and 54 offices in Russia and abroad.

Aeroflot Group 

In February 2010, the Russian government announced that all state-owned regional airlines managed by holding company Rostec would be consolidated into flag carrier Aeroflot to increase financial viability.

On 16 November 2011, 75% minus 1 share of Rossiya Airlines JSC was transferred to Aeroflot. In December, 25% plus 1 share were donated to the Government of Saint Petersburg. In accordance with the decree of the city government of 23 December 2011, the main purpose of the transfer is to ensure the implementation of the powers of the Executive bodies of Saint Petersburg to organize the development of the city's transport complex.

In December 2011, a decree was signed by the Government of Saint Petersburg on accepting a gift of 25% of the airline's shares from Rostec. 229,726 ordinary registered non-documentary shares were transferred to the city. The nominal value of one security is 1 thousand rubles. In total, Saint Petersburg has now become the owner of a blocking stake — 25% plus one voting share.

In 2014, the commercial management of Rossiya Airlines JSC was transferred to the parent company Aeroflot. Since the spring-summer schedule, flights of Rossiya Airlines have been operated under a single code for the Aeroflot Group of companies. Rossiya Airlines became a participant in the Aeroflot Bonus frequent-flyer programme.

Merger with Donavia and Orenair
In December 2015, Aeroflot Group announced the unification of its regional airline affiliates Rossiya, Donavia (based at Rostov-on-Don Airport) and Orenair (with hubs at Orenburg Tsentralny Airport and Moscow's Domodedovo International Airport) under the name Rossiya (the name of the largest of the three). The consolidation excluded Aurora, a small airline headquartered in Yuzhno-Sakhalinsk. Rossiya, Donavia and Orenair served 48 domestic and 42 international destinations; the new Rossiya will add some destinations served by Transaero Airlines prior to its collapse in October. As of the end of February 2016, the merger of the three airlines was completed and joined flights of three airlines started on 27 March of the same year.
On 27 March 2016, Rossiya Airlines Donavia and Orenair, which are other subsidiaries of Aeroflot, were integrated under the brand of Rossiya.

Rebranding 
Simultaneously with the presentation of the updated company, the air carrier started the process of rebranding.

An element that looks like a blade is the basis of the corporate pattern of the aircraft livery. Its plastic and shape complement the company's logo. The element consists of modules that graphically repeat the image of the turbine. The pattern changes its density from the nose of the aircraft to its tail - it becomes more saturated, as if following the flow of air. This technique helps to convey the feeling of flight, movement, even when the plane is on the ground. The name of the airline is printed on the lower part of the fuselage in corporate font.

In April 2016, the airline introduced the first Boeing 747-400 in a new livery, named after Saint Petersburg.

2022 sanctions 
On 8 April 2022, the US Department of Commerce restricted flights on aircraft manufactured in the US for Aeroflot, Aviastar, Azur Air, Belavia, Rossiya and Utair. On 16 June the US broadened its restrictions on the six airlines after violations of the sanctions regime were detected. The effect of the restrictions is to ground the US-manufactured part of its fleet.

As of July 2022, Rossiya Airlines took over all Sukhoi Superjet 100 operations from parent Aeroflot.

Destinations 

The total route network of Rossiya Airlines 53 destinations in the summer of 2020, including significant and highly demanded destinations to cities of the Far East and South of the country.

Fleet

, Rossiya operates the following aircraft:

Partnership with FC Zenit
On 7 July 2014, Rossiya Airlines became the official carrier of Zenit Saint Petersburg football club. The solemn ceremony in connection was held at the Petrovsky Stadium – the home arena of Zenit. The airline has prepared a group of flight attendants to work on flights with the team. In addition, together with doctors and nutritionists, a special sports onboard food has been developed.

In addition to transporting football club players, the plane operates regular flights.

Special projects

Zenitolet 
In July 2014, Rossiya Airlines became the official carrier of Zenit Saint Petersburg football club. On October 29, 2014, the aircraft was delivered to the Netherlands for painting. On November 11 of the same year, the liner was presented at Pulkovo International Airport.

Care About Tigers/Tigrolet 
In September 2016, Rossiya Airlines together with the Amur Tiger Center presented a Boeing 747-400 (EI-XLD, Ex.Japan Airlines JA8914) aircraft named after Yuzhno-Sakhalinsk in a special tiger livery. The goal of the project is to attract public attention to the conservation of populations of rare species of wild animals. The airliner operates the most popular routes to the cities of the Far East and popular resort destinations within Russia. The aircraft made its first flight on September 11 to Vladivostok.

Far Eastern (Amur) Leopard/Leolet 
In February 2017, Rossiya Airlines unveiled Boeing 777-300 (EI-UNP, Ex.Singapore Airlines 9V-SYB) named after the city of Ussuriysk, featuring the muzzle of the Far Eastern (Amur) leopard, the rarest of all leopard subspecies. The aircraft performs flights on the most popular and socially significant routes to the cities of the Far East and popular domestic and international resorts.

Sportolet 
On 29 May 2018, the airline received an Airbus A319 VQ-BCP Rostov-on-Don in a new exclusive livery dedicated to Russian sports. In June 2018, a competition to choose a name for the airliner in a new unique sports livery was announced on the airline's social network. During the week, the contestants offered more than 130 different names. The most popular was Sportolet.

Troika 
In April 2022, Rossiya Airlines unveiled Sukhoi Superjet 100-95B (RA-89022) named after the city of Velsk in a new exclusive livery «Troika», which was timed to coincide with the Year of Cultural Heritage of the Peoples of Russia. The graphic element in the form of three racing harnessed horses is a tribute to the unique phenomenon of Russian culture and visually enhances the effect of flight.

References

External links

 Оfficial website of Rossiya Airlines
Instagram account of Rossiya Airlines
YouTube channel of Rossiya Airlines
Official telegram-channel of Rossiya Airlines
Official VK community of Rossiya Airlines

1934 establishments in the Soviet Union
Airlines of Russia
Airlines established in 1934
Airlines established in 1992
Companies based in Saint Petersburg
Russian brands
Russian companies established in 1992
Government-owned airlines
Government-owned companies of Russia
Aeroflot